The Amazonian royal flycatcher (Onychorhynchus coronatus) is a passerine bird in the family Tityridae according to the International Ornithological Committee (IOC). It is found in throughout most of the Amazon basin in northern Bolivia, eastern Peru, eastern Ecuador, eastern Colombia, Venezuela, the Guianas, and northern and western Brazil.

Taxonomy and systematics

The IOC considers the Amazonian royal flycatcher and three other royal flycatcher taxa to be separate species and places them in the family Tityridae. The South American Classification Committee of the American Ornithological Society (SACC-AOS) and the Clements taxonomy consider the four to be subspecies of the widespread royal flycatcher (Onychorhynchus coronatus sensu lato). SACC-AOS places O. coronatus in family Onychorhynchidae and includes four other flycatcher species in that family. Clements places it in family Oxyruncidae and includes those four, one other flycatcher, and the sharpbill. IOC considers all of them to be in Tityridae.

The Amazonian royal flycatcher has two subspecies, the nominate Onychorhynchus coronatus coronatus and O. c. castelnaui.

Description

It is dark brown above and dark buffy yellow below. The rump and tail are reddish cinnamon. The bill is long and broad. It has an erectile fan-shaped crest that is red in the male and yellow-orange in the female.

Distribution and habitat

The nominate subspecies of the Amazonian royal flycatcher is found in southern and eastern Venezuela, the Guianas, and in Brazil east of the Rio Negro and Rio Tapajós. O. c. castelnaui is found east of the Andes in western Amazonia, from southeastern Colombia and Venezuela's Amazonas state south through Ecuador into Peru and northern Bolivia and east in Brazil to the Rio Negro and Rio Tapajós.

The Amazonian royal flycatcher inhabits humid lowlands, both primary evergreen and second growth forests. It is a bird of the midstory, often along streams and in seasonally flooded várzea forest.

Behavior

Feeding

All of the royal flycatchers are insectivorous.

Breeding

The Amazonian royal flycatcher's breeding season has not been established. Their nest is long and narrow and is suspended from a branch or vine, usually above water. The clutch is two eggs; only the female incubates them and broods and feeds the nestlings.

Vocalization

The Amazonian royal flycatcher is usually inconspicuous and quiet. Its song is  "a descending, slowing series of plaintive whistles" and its call a repeated "keeeyup or keee-yew".

Status

The IUCN has assessed the Amazonian royal flycatcher as being of Least Concern. However, all of the royal flycatchers "are vulnerable to forest loss or degradation".

References

External links 
 
 

Amazonian royal flycatcher
Birds of the Amazon Basin
Birds of the Guianas
Amazonian royal flycatcher
Amazonian royal flycatcher